Agios Georgios or San Giorgio is a Greek unpopulated and uninhabited island in the entry of Saronic Gulf. It’s the largest uninhabited island of the Saronic Islands with an area of 4.3 km2.

History
In antiquity the island was named Belbina and it is mentioned by Herodotus in a dialogue between Themistocles and his political opponent Timodemos from Afidnes. There was also a town of the same name on the island.
Though some scholars have proposed that Agios Georgios should be identified as the ancient Psyttaleia which was involved in the Battle of Salamis, the consensus remains with the island that has long been known as Lipsokoutali, now renamed Psyttaleia.

Modern times
In 2016 a 73 MW wind farm was built on the island by Terna Energy, and delivers about 250 GWh electricity per year to Athens. Administratively, the island has belonged to the municipality of Hydra since 1834. In recent years, the municipality of Lavreotiki challenged the ownership of the island (and its associated wind farm revenues), however a 2017 legal judgement reaffirmed Hydra's ownership.

References

Saronic Islands
Uninhabited islands of Greece
Wind farms in Greece